Lydia Fernández may refer to:
 Lidia Fernández, Costa Rican suffragist and feminist
 Lydia Fernández (singer), Mexican singer